Catechin glucoside may refer to:
 Catechin-3-O-glucoside
 Catechin-3'-O-glucoside
 Catechin-4'-O-glucoside
 Catechin-5-O-glucoside
 Catechin-7-O-glucoside